The 2021 season of The Hundred was the inaugural season of The Hundred, a professional franchise 100-ball cricket tournament involving eight men's and women's teams located in major cities across England and Wales. The tournament was run by the England and Wales Cricket Board (ECB) and took place for the first time, having been delayed a year due to the COVID-19 pandemic.

The tournament gave equal weight to both men's and women's sides, with almost all the matches taking place as back-to-back double-headers at the same venue on the same day, with one ticket giving access to both the men's and women's games.

Format
One-hundred-ball cricket is a form of limited overs cricket, played by two teams each playing a single innings made up of 100 deliveries.  

The format of the game is:
100 balls per innings
A change of ends after 10 balls
Bowlers deliver either five or 10 consecutive balls
Each bowler can deliver a maximum of 20 balls per game
Each bowling side gets a strategic time-out of up to two and a half minutes
A 25-ball powerplay start for each team
Two fielders are allowed outside the initial 30-yard circle during the powerplay
Teams will be able to call time-outs, as has been the case in the IPL since 2009 
The non-striker must return to their original end after a caught dismissal
No-balls are worth two runs

Teams

The eight teams competing in the 2021 season are new franchises, operating separately from the existing county cricket clubs. Each represents a large area of England and Wales, with venues chosen for their locations in major cities. Andy Flower replaced Stephen Fleming as the coach of Trent Rockets (men) and Jonathan Batty replaced Lydia Greenway as the coach of Oval Invincibles (women) before the start of the season.

Tournament structure
Eight city-based teams competed for the men's and women's titles over a month between 21 July and 21 August 2021, ensuring that the competition took place during the school summer holidays. Aside from the opening two fixtures featuring the Oval Invincibles vs the Manchester Originals, all men's and women's matches were held on the same day at the same grounds.

There were 64 matches in the league stage (32 men's, 32 women's). Each team played four matches at home and four matches away. This included one match against every other side and then a second bonus match against their nearest regional rivals.

Once the league stage was completed the top three teams competed in the knockout stage to decide the ultimate champions. The second and third teams met in a semi-final, which was played at the Oval. The winner of the semi-final then met the team that finished top of the league in the final at Lord's.

Squads
Each squad was made up of 15 players, of whom a maximum of three could be overseas players. Players were signed using a draft system common in other franchise leagues. Two of the 15 players came from players who performed well in the T20 Blast. At least one England Test player was signed to each of the eight men's teams competing in The Hundred.

On 3 October 2019 the first players to be allocated to teams were announced. They were as follows:

The draft took place on 20 October 2019 at Sky Studios in Osterley. Sky Sports and BBC Sport showed the event live.

Broadcasting
All games were televised by Sky Sports, with the BBC also showing 10 men's and 8 women's games free-to-air. Sky also showed all of the women's games and some of the men's games in full on its YouTube channel.

Standings

Women

 advances to the Final
 advances to the Eliminator

Men

 advances to the Final
 advances to the Eliminator

Fixtures (Women)

July

August

Fixtures (Men)

July

August

Knockout stages

Women

Eliminator

Final

Men

Eliminator

Final

Statistics

Most runs

Women

Men

Most wickets

Women

Men

See also
 T20 Blast
 Royal London One-Day Cup

Notes

References

External links
Official website
Women's Series home at ESPN Cricinfo
Men's Series home at ESPN Cricinfo

The Hundred (cricket)
English domestic cricket competitions
Professional sports leagues in England
Professional sports leagues in the United Kingdom
2021 in English cricket
2021 in English women's cricket